Neptis saclava, the spotted sailer, is a butterfly of the family Nymphalidae. It is native to Madagascar and to large areas of sub-Saharan Africa.

Its wingspan is 40–45 mm in males and 45–48 mm in females. Adults are on the wing year round with a peak from December to May.

The larvae feed on Acalypha glabrata, Combretum bracteosum, Ricinus communis, Australina, and Pilea.

Subspecies
Recognised subspecies:
N. s. saclava – Madagascar
N. s. marpessa Hopffer, 1855 – small spotted sailer, native to southern Nigeria, Cameroon to Ethiopia to Zambia, Mozambique, Zimbabwe, Eswatini, South Africa: Limpopo, Mpumalanga, North West, Gauteng, KwaZulu-Natal, Eastern Cape

References

saclava
Butterflies described in 1833